Tlos, also known as Gelos, was a town of ancient Caria. The town name does not appear in ancient writers but is inferred from epigraphic evidence.
 
Its site is tentatively located near Pinarlıbükü, Asiatic Turkey.

References

Populated places in ancient Caria
Former populated places in Turkey